The W. T. and Idalia Reid Prize is an annual award presented by the Society for Industrial and Applied Mathematics (SIAM) for outstanding research in, or other contributions to, the broadly defined areas of differential equations and control theory. It was established in 1994 in memory of long-time University of Oklahoma mathematics professor W. T. Reid, who died in 1977.

Recipients 
The recipients of the W .T. and Idalia Reid Prize are:

 1994: Wendell H. Fleming
1996: Roger W. Brockett
1998: Jacques-Louis Lions
2000: Constantine Dafermos
2001: Eduardo D. Sontag
2002: Harvey Thomas Banks
2003: Harold J. Kushner
2004: Arthur J. Krener
2005: 
2006: Peter E. Kloeden
2007: Héctor J. Sussmann
2008: Max Gunzburger
2009: Anders Lindquist
2010: John A. Burns
2011: Irena Lasiecka
2012: Ruth F. Curtain
2013: Tyrone Duncan
2014: Alain Bensoussan
2015: Francis Clarke
2016: Yannís G. Kevrekidis
2017: Jean-Michel Coron
2018: Volker Mehrmann
2019: Miroslav Krstić
2020: Roland Glowinski
2021: Karl Kunisch
2022: Enrique Zuazua
2023: Robert John McCann

See also

 List of mathematics awards

References 

Awards of the Society for Industrial and Applied Mathematics